Boraras naevus is a fish in the family Cyprinidae endemic to Thailand. Its locations include swampy areas north of Surat Thani, the Tapi River drainage (located on the Gulf of Thailand), and the Andaman Sea slope of the Malay Peninsula near Trang.

References 

Fish of Thailand
Taxa named by Maurice Kottelat
Fish described in 2011
Boraras